The Starter Wife is a 2007 USA Network television miniseries, based on the 2006 novel of the same name by Gigi Levangie Grazer.  Its title is derived from the concept of a starter marriage. Filmed over four months in Queensland, Australia, the plot focuses on Molly Kagan (Debra Messing) who, after years of marriage to a Hollywood film mogul, is forced to redefine herself and her role in society when her husband leaves her for a younger woman.

The mini-series premiered with a two-hour presentation on May 31, 2007 at 9:00 pm ET. The premiere attracted 5.4 million viewers, with 2.8 million of them being adults aged 25–54 (the network's target demographic). Ratings steadily decreased as the series progressed. The series is available for purchase on iTunes (to American customers only) and was available for DVD purchase starting September 11, 2007.

The miniseries was nominated for ten Emmy Awards, including Outstanding Miniseries, Lead Actress in a Miniseries or a Movie (Debra Messing), Supporting Actor in a Miniseries or a Movie (Joe Mantegna), Supporting Actress in a Miniseries or a Movie (Judy Davis), and Writing for a Miniseries, Movie, or Dramatic Special (Josann McGibbon & Sara Parriott). Davis was the sole winner, while Messing was also nominated for a Golden Globe Award and Screen Actors Guild Award for Outstanding Actress in a Miniseries or TV Movie.

Although initially intended as a one-shot miniseries, USA subsequently ordered The Starter Wife as a new series for the 2008 spring season. Production on the series first ten-episode season was delayed due to the 2007–2008 Writers Guild of America strike, and began airing October 10, 2008.

Characters
Molly Kagan (Debra Messing) is a 41-year-old wife and mother of five-year-old daughter Jaden (Miniseries: Bethany Whitmore; Series: Brielle Barbusca). Soon after the characters are introduced, she is abandoned by her husband and is forced to rebuild her life and assert herself within the film community, most of which ignores her after the split.
Joan McAllister (Judy Davis) is Molly's oldest friend and an alcoholic socialite who lends Molly her beachfront Malibu home when she pretends to jet off to Paris but actually enters a rehab center in Ojai. She later calls upon Molly to impersonate her non-existent sister "Bambi", upon whom she has placed all blame for her failings, when her therapist insists the two confront each other and work out their hostilities.
Cricket Stewart (Miranda Otto) is one of Molly's friends whose allegiance to her is tested when her film director husband, a business associate of Kenny's, demands she break all ties with her. When she discovers him in a compromising situation with their children's nanny, she orders him to leave the house and reconnects with Molly. She later takes him back but has difficulty forgetting the image of her husband with the nanny.  After she discovers she is pregnant she tells Molly that she has finally found the image to replace the one of her husband cheating.
Rodney Evans (Chris Diamantopoulos), one of Molly's best friends, is a gay interior decorator suffering a financial setback.
Kenny Kagan (Miniseries: Peter Jacobson) is Molly's soon-to-be ex-husband and President of Production at Durango Pictures. He leaves Molly for a woman half his age and aims to replace the current CEO of the company.
Sam Knight (Stephen Moyer) is a homeless beach bum who saves Molly from drowning. He openly scorns her as superficial but the two eventually become involved in a romantic relationship. It is later revealed he spent five years in prison for involuntary manslaughter after his best friend was killed in a car crash caused by Sam's DUI.
Lou Manahan (Joe Mantegna) is the head of Durango Pictures. He fakes his suicide by drowning to start anew, yet cannot help but attend his memorial service (disguised as a woman) to see how his friends and colleagues react to his death.
Lavender (Anika Noni Rose) is the security guard at the entrance to the gated community where Joan lives. Molly takes her and her grandmother under her wing when they are evicted from their apartment for having a dog.
Shoshanna (Trilby Glover) is a young pop music singer who becomes involved with Kenny. It is revealed she was only using him to advance her career and she dumps him when he is fired from his job.

Nielsen Ratings by episode

International broadcasting

Awards and nominations

References

External links
 Official Site at USA Network
 
The Starter Wife Review at Variety.com
The Starter Wife Review at Reuters

2007 American television series debuts
2007 American television series endings
2000s American comedy television miniseries
2007 telenovelas
Television shows based on American novels
American telenovelas
Television series by 3 Arts Entertainment
Television series by Universal Television
USA Network original programming
2000s American romantic comedy television series
Primetime Emmy Award-winning television series